Abrakurrie Cave is a wild cave on the Nullarbor Plain in Western Australia.

Visits to the cave occurred as early as the 1880s.

The cave was explored by an expedition led by Captain J. M. Thompson in 1935. After progressing a further  the group found the passage forked into two passages one of which continued a further  leading to a huge cavern.

Photographs of the cave were published after the 1935 expedition.

It was a well documented cave by the 1960s.

See also
 List of caves in Australia

References

External links
Inside Abrakurrie Cave (1935) State Library of South Australia
Abrakurrie Cave Caves of Australia

Caves of Western Australia
Wild caves
Nullarbor Plain